Crassispira quoniamensis is an extinct species of sea snail, a marine gastropod mollusk in the family Pseudomelatomidae, the turrids and allies.

This species, as † Drillia quoniamensis  Boussac in Périer, 1941, has also been considered a synonym of Crassispira (Tripia) sulcata adriani (Dollfus, 1899)

Description

Distribution
Fossils have been found in Eocene strata in the Paris Basin, France.

References

 Périer (S.), 1941 Contribution à l'étude du Ludien du Bassin de Paris. La faune des marnes à Pholadomya ludensis, p. 1-30
 Furon (R.) & Soyer (R.), 1947 Catalogue des fossiles tertiaires du Bassin de Paris, p. 1-240
 Tucker (J.K.) & Le Renard (J.), 1993 Liste bibliographique des Turridae (Gastropoda, Conacea) du Paléogène de l'Angleterre, de la Belgique et de la France. Cossmanniana, t. 2, vol. 1–2, p. 1-66
 Le Renard (J.) & Pacaud (J.-M.), 1995 Révision des Mollusques paléogènes du Bassin de Paris. 2 - Liste des références primaires des espèces. Cossmanniana, t. 3, vol. 3, p. 65-132 
 Pacaud (J.-M.) & Le Renard (J.), 1995 - Révision des Mollusques paléogènes du Bassin de Paris. Annexe: Modifications à apporter à la partie 2. in Partie 4 - Liste systématique réactualisée. Cossmanniana, t. 3, vol. 4, p. 151-187

External links
 Pacaud J.M. & Le Renard J. (1995). Révision des Mollusques paléogènes du Bassin de Paris. IV- Liste systématique actualisée. Cossmanniana. 3(4): 151-187

quoniamensis
Gastropods described in 1941